The following is a list of translators from Ukrainian of works of Ukrainian literature and humanities into other languages. They are listed by the language into which they translated these works.

Albanian

Armenian

Azerbaijani

Belarusian

Bengali

Bulgarian

Catalan

Danish

Dutch

English

German

Latvian

Lithuanian

Polish

Portuguese

Tatar

References 

Ukrainian language
Translators from Ukrainian
Translation-related lists